João Cardoso is a Portuguese musician playing piano and keyboards. He is a member of Portuguese indie rock band Bunnyranch where he plays piano, keyboards and vocals alongside fellow band members Carlos Mendes (drums, vocals, percussion), Pedro Calhau (bass) and Augusto Cardoso (guitar).

For the period 2004 to 2006, he was involved in the Humanos project and took part in the release of two highly successful albums as part of Humanos, namely Humanos (2004) and Humanos ao Vivo in 2006.

Discography
With Bunnyranch
2004: Trying to Lose

With Humanos
2004: Humanos
2006: Humanos ao Vivo (Live album)

External links
Bunnyranch MySpace site

Portuguese musicians
Portuguese male musicians
Living people
Indie rock musicians
Year of birth missing (living people)
Place of birth missing (living people)
21st-century Portuguese musicians
21st-century male musicians